The 2019 Boston College Eagles football team represented Boston College during the 2019 NCAA Division I FBS football season. The Eagles played their home games at Alumni Stadium in Chestnut Hill, Massachusetts and competed in the Atlantic Division of the Atlantic Coast Conference. They were led by seventh-year head coach Steve Addazio until his dismissal on December 1, 2019. For their bowl game, the Eagles were led by interim head coach Rich Gunnell.

Preseason

Coaching changes
In January 2019, head coach Steve Addazio announced the hiring of Mike Bajakian as the new offensive coordinator, replacing Scot Loeffler, who left to take the head coaching job at Bowling Green. Bajakian had spent the previous four years as the quarterbacks coach for the Tampa Bay Buccaneers.

Preseason media poll
In the preseason ACC media poll, Boston College was predicted to finish in fifth in the Atlantic Division.

Award watch lists
Listed in the order that they were released

Schedule
Boston College's 2019 schedule began with their conference home opener against Virginia Tech on August 31. In non-conference play, the Eagles played home games against Richmond of the Colonial Athletic Association and Kansas of the Big 12 Conference, and road games against Rutgers of the Big Ten Conference and Notre Dame, a football independent. In ACC play, they faced the other members of the Atlantic Division as well as Virginia Tech and Pittsburgh from the Coastal Division.

Game summaries

Virginia Tech

Richmond

Kansas

The Kansas Jayhawks came into the game as a three touchdown underdog, but performances by quarterback Carter Stanley (238 yards passing) and running back Pooka Williams Jr. (121 yards rushing) combined with other efforts to give the Jayhawks their first road win against a "power 5" team in almost 11 years.

Boston College scored first and had the lead 10-0 until the Jayhawks scored on six straight possessions.  Kansas took the lead 28-24 at the half thanks to an 82 yard run with 40 seconds remaining before the break to set up a 3-yard score just two plays later.  Kansas continued to score in the second half but Boston College could not match the effort.  The final score was Kansas 48, Boston College 24.

at Rutgers

Wake Forest

at Louisville

NC State

at Clemson

at Syracuse

Florida State

at Notre Dame

at Pittsburgh

vs. Cincinnati (Birmingham Bowl)

Players drafted into the NFL

References

Boston College
Boston College Eagles football seasons
Boston College Eagles football
Boston College Eagles football